Carlos Amarel Ferreira is a Paralympic track and field athlete from Portugal competing mainly in category T10/T11, visually-impaired, long-distance running events.

He competed in the 1992 Summer Paralympics in Barcelona, Spain. There he won a silver medal in the men's Football 7-a-side event. At the 1996 Summer Paralympics in Atlanta, United States, he changed sports to compete in athletics. There he finished sixth in the men's 5000 metres T10 event and won a bronze medal in the men's 10000 metres T10 event. He also competed at the 2000 Summer Paralympics in Sydney, Australia, winning a gold medal in the men's Marathon T11 event and a silver medal in the men's 10000 metres T11 event. He also competed at the 2004 Summer Paralympics in Athens, Greece, winning a silver medal in the men's 10000 metres T11 event and a silver medal in the men's Marathon T11 event.

References
 

Year of birth missing (living people)
Living people
Portuguese male marathon runners
Portuguese male long-distance runners
Visually impaired long-distance runners
Paralympic athletes of Portugal
Athletes (track and field) at the 1996 Summer Paralympics
Athletes (track and field) at the 2000 Summer Paralympics
Athletes (track and field) at the 2004 Summer Paralympics
Paralympic 7-a-side footballers of Portugal
7-a-side footballers at the 1988 Summer Paralympics
Paralympic gold medalists for Portugal
Paralympic silver medalists for Portugal
Paralympic bronze medalists for Portugal
Medalists at the 1992 Summer Paralympics
Medalists at the 1996 Summer Paralympics
Medalists at the 2000 Summer Paralympics
Medalists at the 2004 Summer Paralympics
7-a-side footballers at the 1992 Summer Paralympics
Medalists at the World Para Athletics European Championships
Paralympic medalists in athletics (track and field)
Paralympic long-distance runners
Paralympic marathon runners
Visually impaired marathon runners
Blind people
Portuguese people with disabilities